Hainault Forest was a large, mostly wooded area of Essex, which was mostly destroyed after 1851. Less than a tenth of the forest survives; with most of the surviving fragments managed as a part of Hainault Forest Country Park. The country park also includes other habitats.

The country park is located on the edge of Greater London, with portions in the London Borough of Redbridge; the London Borough of Havering; and in the Lambourne parish of the Epping Forest District in Essex.

Geography

The Redbridge section of the park is managed by Vision Redbridge who manage the park on behalf of Redbridge Council. Across the border, the Essex section is managed by the Woodland Trust, who hold a long-term lease for the management by its owners, Essex County Council.

History
Hainault Forest is a remnant of the former Forest of Essex which once covered most of the county of Essex. Epping Forest, Hatfield Forest and Writtle Forest were also part of the former Forest of Essex. Most of the forest was part of the Manor of Barking, which was held by the nuns of abbey of Barking until the Dissolution of the Monasteries; it extended east to Havering-atte-Bower, and south to Aldborough Hatch, and westwards to Leytonstone.

The forest land, which had previously been managed as a common, was enclosed (privatised) following an Act of Parliament, 1851, disafforested, the deer removed, and 92% of the old growth forest cut down. The land became marginal agricultural land and subsequently a significant proportion has been built on. The destruction was deplored by Sir Walter Besant in his works on London: the forest is also the setting for his novel All in a Garden Fair.

Oliver Rackham described how the outrage at the destruction of Hainault led to the modern conservation movement with the creation of conservation groups which successfully opposed such a fate happening to Epping Forest.

Preservation
It included 253 acres (1.0 km2) of woodland and rough pasture.

Hainault Forest Country Park protected areas include: open space parklands — with numerous public footpaths and a large lake; Hainault Forest Golf Club; and Foxburrows Farm — which is used in part for preserving rare breeds of animals.

Gallery

See also
List of Sites of Special Scientific Interest in Greater London
List of Sites of Special Scientific Interest in Essex

References

External links

Unofficial Hainault Forest Country Park website
London Gardens Online: Hainault Forest Country Park website
Natural England: Citation — Hainault Forest

Common land in London
Country parks in Essex
Country parks in London
Epping Forest District
Forests and woodlands of Essex
Parks and open spaces in the London Borough of Havering
Parks and open spaces in the London Borough of Redbridge
Sites of Special Scientific Interest in Essex
Sites of Special Scientific Interest in London